The Latin Grammy Award for Best Tejano Album is an honor presented annually at the Latin Grammy Awards, a ceremony that recognizes excellence and creates a wider awareness of cultural diversity and contributions of Latin recording artists in the United States and internationally. The award goes to solo artists, duos, or groups for releasing vocal or instrumental albums containing at least 51% of new recordings in the tejano music genre.

Jimmy González & El Grupo Mazz are the biggest winners in this category with five awards, including four years in a row from 2001 to 2004, and they are followed by Los Palominos, with two, who were also the first winners of this category in 2000 for the album Por Eso Te Amo. In 2008, Emilio Navaira became the first and so far only solo singer to earn this award for the album De Nuevo.

To date the award has only been presented to artists originating from the United States, most of them chicanos. This is the only category that features no winners or nominees from a Latin American country.

Winners and nominees

2000s

2010s

2020s

 Each year is linked to the article about the Latin Grammy Awards held that year.

See also
Grammy Award for Best Tejano Album
Grammy Award for Best Regional Mexican or Tejano Album
Latin Grammy Award for Best Regional Song

References

General
  Note: User must select the "Regional Field" category as the genre under the search feature.

Specific

External links
Official site of the Latin Grammy Awards

Latin Grammy Awards for Regional Mexican music
Tejano music
Tejano Album